The following highways are numbered 576:

United States